KVA may refer to:

 Kavala International Airport (IATA code: KVA), an airport located in the municipality of Nestos, in Greece
 Korea Volleyball Association, the governing body for volleyball in South Korea
 KVA, a fictional terrorist group in the 2014 first-person shooter video game Call of Duty: Advanced Warfare
 KVA, an X-Value Adjustment for regulatory capital
 Royal Swedish Academy of Sciences, one of the royal academies of Sweden